is a former Japanese football player. He married Nami Otake, a former professional footballer on the Japan women's national football team, on 29 June 2012.

References

External links

1987 births
Living people
Association football people from Niigata Prefecture
Japanese footballers
J1 League players
J2 League players
Japan Football League players
Tokyo Verdy players
Fagiano Okayama players
Mito HollyHock players
Matsumoto Yamaga FC players
Expatriate footballers in Thailand
Association football midfielders